One of My Wives Is Missing is a television thriller (ABC, 1976) with Jack Klugman, Elizabeth Ashley, James Franciscus, Joel Fabiani, and others. The teleplay was based on the 1960s stageplay Trap for a Single Man. The play also inspired two other television films, Honeymoon with a Stranger and Vanishing Act.

Cast

 Jack Klugman - Inspector Levine
 Elizabeth Ashley - Elizabeth Corban
 James Franciscus - Daniel Corban
 Joel Fabiani - Father Kelleher
 Milton Selzer - Sidney Bernstein
 Ruth McDevitt - Rebecca Foster
 Garry Walberg - Officer Foley
 Tony Costello - Bert
 Byron Webster - Manager

References 

1976 television films
1976 films
ABC network original films
Films scored by Billy Goldenberg
American television films
Films directed by Glenn Jordan